County Down is one of the six counties of Northern Ireland.

County Down is bordered by County Antrim to the north, the Irish Sea to the east, County Armagh to the west and County Louth in the Republic of Ireland across Carlingford Lough to the southwest.

This list shows towns and cities in bold.

A

B

C

D

E

G

H

K

L

M

N

P

R

S

T

W

See also
List of civil parishes of County Down
List of townlands in County Down

Down

Down
Places